Artigas may refer to:

People
 Francesc Santacruz i Artigas (17th-18th century), Catalan sculptor of Baroque works
 João Batista Vilanova Artigas (1915-1985), Brazilian modernist architect
 Jorge Artigas (born 1975), Argentine-Uruguayan footballer 
 José Gervasio Artigas (1764-1850), central figure in Uruguay's struggles for independence from Spain and Buenos Aires
 Josep Llorens i Artigas (1892–1980), Spanish ceramic artist
 Mariano Artigas (1938–2006), Spanish physicist, philosopher, and theologian
 Salvador Artigas (1913–1997), Spanish footballer and manager
 Santiago Artigas (1881-1931), Spanish actor

Places
 Artigas, Uruguay, a city
 Artigas Department, a region of Uruguay
 Artigas Base, an Uruguayan research station in Antarctica
 Pueblo Capitán Juan Antonio Artigas, a former denomination of Barros Blancos, Uruguay
 Fortaleza General Artigas, a fortress on top of the Cerro de Montevideo

Other
 Flag of Artigas, a national symbol of Uruguay
 A number of ships of the National Navy of Uruguay
 Count d'Artigas, alias used by the pirate Ker Karraje in Jules Verne's "Facing the Flag"